Siri Sampadalu is a 1962 Indian Telugu-language drama film, produced by V. Venkateswarlu and directed by P. Pullaiah. It stars Akkineni Nageswara Rao and Savitri, with music composed by Master Venu.

Plot
Jagapathi Naidu (Gummadi) inculpates his brother-in-law Chakradhar (A. V. Subbarao Jr.) for his father Raghupathi Naidu's (Nagayya) death. This creates a rift in the joint family and Chakradhar leaves for the city with his wife Parvathi (Santhakumari) and son Prasad. Years pass by. Now grownups, Jagapathi's three daughters, Padma (Savitri), Latha (Vasanthi), and Rama (Girija) pursue higher studies in the city. They meet their cousin Prasad (ANR) and aunt Parvathi (Santhakumari). Love kindles between Padma and Prasad. A furious Jagapathi brings his daughters back to Seethanagaram. Jagapathi loses all his wealth to charity. Moneylender Bhujangam (Rajanala) brings his house to auction. Provoked by Bhujangam, Jagapathi hits him and is sentenced to three months imprisonment. Prasad buys "Anandanilayam" in the auction.

Jagapathi's accountant Garatayya (Ramana Reddy) steals his jewels and gives them to Bhujangam. Garatayya's son Anand (Relangi) finds that out and informs Prasad. When Prasad meets Bhujangam for the jewels, Bhujangam darkens the room, hits him, and throws him into the river. Jagapathi completes his sentence. Prasad, in the guise of Athmaram, receives him. Prasad calls everyone including Bhujangam to Anandanilayam. It is revealed that Bhujangam had hit Anand and not Prasad and Prasad had saved Anand from drowning. The culprits are thus exposed. Jagapathi regrets his hatred for his sister's family. A repentant Bhujangam seeks pardon. Prasad marries Padma and Bhujangam's son Madhu (Chalam) weds Latha.

Cast

Akkineni Nageswara Rao as Prasad
Savitri as Padma
V. Nagayya as Raghupathi Naidu
Gummadi as Jagapathi Naidu
Relangi as AK Maar / Anand Kumar
Ramana Reddy as Garatayya
Rajanala as Bhujanga Rao
Chalam as Madhu
Chadalavada as Anjaiah
Allu Ramalingaiah as Appanna
Dr. Sivarama Krishnayya as Panakala Rao
A. V. Subba Rao Jr. as Chakradharam
Prabhakar Reddy as Doctor
Santha Kumari as Parvathi
Suryakantham as Bhadramma
Girija as Rama
Vasanthi as Latha
Surabhi Balasaraswathi as Kondamma

Soundtrack

Music composed by Master Venu.

Awards
National Film Awards
National Film Award for Best Feature Film in Telugu - 1962

References 

1962 films
1960s Telugu-language films
Films directed by P. Pullayya
Films scored by Master Venu